Pezzoli is an Italian surname. Notable people with the surname include:

Adriano Pezzoli (born 1964), Italian male long-distance runner
Cristina Pezzoli (1963–2020), Italian theatre director
Gian Giacomo Poldi Pezzoli (1822–1879), Italian count 

Italian-language surnames